Melawondi is a rural locality in the Gympie Region, Queensland, Australia. In the  Melawondi had a population of 30 people.

Geography 
Melawondi railway station is an abandoned railway station on the Mary Valley railway line.

History
The locality takes its name from a former railway station. Melawondi is believed to be the name of an Aboriginal clan.

In October 2013, Hyne Timber sold their Melawondi timber mill to Superior Wood Pty Ltd.

In the  Melawondi had a population of 30 people.

Heritage listings
Melawondi has a number of heritage-listed sites, including:
 Melawondi's cream shed, one of the three Mary Valley Railway Cream Sheds

Economy 
Melawondi Mill is a timber mill owned by Superior Wood Pty Ltd. The mill employs approximately 100 people.

Education 
There are no schools in Melawondi. The nearest primary school is Kandanga State School in neighbouring Kandanga to the north-west. The nearest secondary school is Mary Valley State College in neighbouring Imbil to the south but it only offers secondary education to Year 10. For secondary education to Year 12 the nearest school is Gympie State High School in Gympie to the north.

References

Gympie Region
Localities in Queensland